Glenloch Interchange is Canberra's only major interchange which connects Tuggeranong Parkway with Parkes Way, William Hovell Drive and Caswell Drive (Gungahlin Drive Extension). Following a major reconstruction lasting from 2007 to mid-2008, the interchange now operates without traffic lights. A surprising feature was the retention of an unused bridge from the previous alignment which led from the centre of the Parkes Way/Caswell Drive loop, passing east over two northbound roads, before petering out to the east. This was finally removed in late 2010 during roadworks to upgrade the new interchange to dual carriageway standards.

See also

References 

Road interchanges in Australia
Roads in the Australian Capital Territory